Marc Hirschi (born 24 August 1998) is a Swiss cyclist, who currently rides for UCI WorldTeam .

Career
In the same month, Hirschi won the under-23 road race at the UCI Road World Championships in Innsbruck, Austria. In August 2020, he was named in the startlist for the 2020 Tour de France, during which he won a stage, three combative rider awards for his performances on individual stages and the overall Combativity award. One week after the end of the Tour, he took the bronze medal in the Men's road race at the Road World Championships in Imola. Three days later Hirschi took the win at La Flèche Wallonne, pulling away from the rest of the lead group in the last 50 metres of the final climb of the Mur de Huy. He was the first Swiss rider to win the race since Ferdinand Kübler in 1952.

Major results

2015
 National Junior Road Championships
1st  Road race
2nd Time trial
 1st  Overall Grand Prix Rüebliland
1st  Young rider classification
1st Stage 1
 1st  Overall Grand Prix Général Patton
 5th Trofeo Emilio Paganessi
 UEC European Junior Road Championships
5th Road race
7th Time trial
 8th Overall Oberösterreich Juniorenrundfahrt
 9th Road race, UCI Junior Road World Championships
2016
 1st  Madison (with Reto Müller), UCI Junior Track World Championships
 1st  Road race, National Junior Road Championships
 1st  Madison (with Reto Müller), National Track Championships
 1st  Overall Tour de Pays de Vaud
 1st Trofeo Emilio Paganessi
 2nd  Time trial, UEC European Junior Road Championships
 3rd Overall Grand Prix Rüebliland
1st Stage 3
 3rd Overall Grand Prix Général Patton
 3rd Gent–Wevelgem Juniors
 5th Trofeo Buffoni
 6th Paris–Roubaix Juniors
 8th Time trial, UCI Junior Road World Championships
2017
 1st  Time trial, National Under–23 Road Championships
 1st Tour du Jura
 UEC European Under–23 Road Championships
3rd  Road race
8th Time trial
 6th Piccolo Giro di Lombardia
 7th Ronde van Vlaanderen Beloften
2018
 1st  Road race, UCI Road World Under–23 Championships
 1st  Road race, UEC European Under–23 Road Championships
 2nd Overall Tour Alsace
1st Stage 3
 3rd Overall Grand Prix Priessnitz spa
1st Stage 2
 National Under–23 Road Championships
3rd Road race
4th Time trial
 4th Overall Tour de l'Ain
1st  Young rider classification
 5th Overall Istrian Spring Trophy
1st Stage 2
 5th Liège–Bastogne–Liège Espoirs
 5th Eschborn–Frankfurt Under–23
 6th Ronde van Vlaanderen Beloften
 8th Coppa Ugo Agostoni
 10th Overall Tour de Savoie Mont Blanc
 10th Tour du Doubs
 10th Tacx Pro Classic
2019
 National Road Championships
2nd Time trial
4th Road race
 3rd Clásica de San Sebastián
 5th Overall BinckBank Tour
 6th Overall Deutschland Tour
1st  Young rider classification
 10th E3 Binckbank Classic
2020
 1st La Flèche Wallonne
 Tour de France
1st Stage 12
Held  after Stages 2–3
 Combativity award Stages 9, 12, 18 & Overall
 2nd Liège–Bastogne–Liège
 3rd  Road race, UCI Road World Championships
2021
 2nd Time trial, National Road Championships
 2nd Overall Tour de Luxembourg
1st Stage 2
 2nd Veneto Classic
 5th Brussels Cycling Classic
 6th Road race, UEC European Road Championships
 6th Liège–Bastogne–Liège
 10th Druivenkoers Overijse
2022
 1st Giro della Toscana
 1st Grand Prix of Aargau Canton
 1st Per sempre Alfredo
 1st Veneto Classic
 3rd Overall Settimana Internazionale di Coppi e Bartali
 8th GP Miguel Induráin
 9th Liège–Bastogne–Liège
 9th Amstel Gold Race
 9th GP Industria & Artigianato
 9th Coppa Sabatini
2023
 4th Clásica Jaén Paraíso Interior
 8th Cadel Evans Great Ocean Road Race

Grand Tour general classification results timeline

Classics results timeline

References

External links

1998 births
Living people
Swiss male cyclists
Cyclists from Bern
Swiss Tour de France stage winners
Olympic cyclists of Switzerland
Cyclists at the 2020 Summer Olympics